Luigi Ferraro may refer to:

 Luigi Ferraro (naval officer) (1914–2006), Italian naval officer
 Luigi Ferraro (rugby player) (born 1982), Italian rugby player for Aironi